The war crimes trial of Slobodan Milošević, the former President of the Federal Republic of Yugoslavia, at the International Criminal Tribunal for the former Yugoslavia (ICTY) lasted for just over four years from 2002 until his death in 2006. Milošević faced 66 counts of crimes against humanity, genocide, and war crimes committed during the Yugoslav Wars of the 1990s. He pleaded not guilty to all the charges.

In 2016, the ICTY issued its judgement in the separate trial of Radovan Karadžić, which concluded that there was no evidence that Milošević had "participated in the realization of the common criminal objective" and that he "and other Serbian leaders openly criticised Bosnian Serb leaders of committing crimes against humanity and ethnic cleansing and the war for their own purposes" during the Bosnian War.

Background
Slobodan Milošević was indicted in May 1999, during the Kosovo War, by the UN's International Criminal Tribunal for the Former Yugoslavia for crimes against humanity in Kosovo. Charges of violating the laws or customs of war, grave breaches of the Geneva Conventions in Croatia and Bosnia and genocide in Bosnia were added a year and a half later.

The charges on which Milošević was indicted were: genocide; complicity in genocide; deportation; murder; persecutions on political, racial or religious grounds; inhumane acts/forcible transfer; extermination; imprisonment; torture; willful killing; unlawful confinement; willfully causing great suffering; unlawful deportation or transfer; extensive destruction and appropriation of property, not justified by military necessity and carried out unlawfully and wantonly; cruel treatment; plunder of public or private property; attacks on civilians; destruction or willful damage done to historic monuments and institutions dedicated to education or religion; unlawful attacks on civilian objects.

The trial

Duration of trial 
Following Milošević's transfer, the original charges of war crimes in Kosovo were upgraded by adding charges of genocide in Bosnia and war crimes in Croatia. On 30 January 2002, Milošević accused the war crimes tribunal of an "evil and hostile attack" against him. The trial began at The Hague on 12 February 2002, with Milošević defending himself. Milošević remained defiant during the process; at the end of his first appearance, he mocked the brevity of the session by looking at his watch and saying "Fifteen minutes."

Rade Marković stated that a written statement he had made implicating Milošević had been extracted from him by ill-treatment legally amounting to torture by named NATO officers  Judge May declared this to be "irrelevant", but Milošević stated that it was forbidden under the 1988 rules concerning evidence gained by torture.

The prosecution took two years to present its case in the first part of the trial, where they covered the wars in Croatia, Bosnia, and Kosovo. Throughout the two-year period, the trial was being closely followed by the public of the involved former Yugoslav republics as it covered various notable events from the war and included several high-profile witnesses.

Milošević, while defending himself, read from Friedrich Naumann's book Mitteleuropa, claiming it was a long-standing objective of German foreign policy and the German liberal party in particular to "erase Serbia from the map", citing a number of alleged wrongdoings by Germany against Serbia during the last hundred years, including the recognition of Croatia and other countries. He pointed out that Klaus Kinkel, the German Foreign Minister who proposed the creation of the tribunal, was a German liberal.

During the prosecution case, 295 witnesses testified and 5,000 exhibits were presented to the court recording a mass of evidence. After the presentation of the prosecution case, the Trial Chamber, on 16 June 2004, rejected a defense motion to dismiss the charges for lack of evidence and ruled in accordance with Rule 98bis, that the prosecution case contains evidence capable of supporting a conviction on all 66 counts. The Defense was given the same amount of time as the prosecution to present its case. There were in total 466 hearing days, four hours per day. 40 hours were left in the Defense case, and the trial was on schedule to end by the end of the spring.

The prosecution was directed by the trial chamber to conclude its Kosovo case during four and a half to five months time span to make way for the presentation in September 2002 of the Bosnia and Croatia cases, followed by a defense case if Milošević wanted to do so. Initially the length of the trial was presumed to go for two years and instead lasted four that contained multiple adjournments which ended with Milošević's death prior to his defense case being completed.

Kosovo Conflict case 

Milošević was indicted for crimes during the Kosovo war, charged with violating international humanitarian law on five counts during 1 January-20 June 1999. The first charge was Deportation (a crime against humanity). The prosecution stated in their case against Milošević that he was part of a criminal enterprise and involved in orchestrating a campaign of violence and terror to force a sizable part of the Kosovo Albanian population to leave and maintain Serb control over Kosovo. The second charge was Other inhumane Acts - Forcible transfer (a crime against humanity), which is similar to the charge of deportation though additionally implying use of force encompassing internal displacement. The third and forth charge entailed Murder (combined in this instance as a crime against humanity and violating the customs and laws of war). Six hundred Kosovars were identified in the indictment as being killed in sixteen individual incidents during mass expulsion. In addition based upon the exhumations of mass graves and the number of missing persons, human rights organisations estimated around ten thousand Kosovars being killed during hostilities, with KLA combatants only forming a small minority of the deceased. Also counted were unarmed combatants killed in violation of the ICTY statute and Geneva Conventions. The fifth charge was Persecutions (a crime against humanity). The indictment referred to Milošević using mass forced population deportation and transfer, sexual assault, murder, along with damage or destruction of Kosovo Albanian religious sites "to execute a campaign of persecution against the Kosovo Albanian based on political, racial or religious grounds".

The ICTY indictment against Milošević referred to methods of persecution done against Kosovo Albanians to "wreak systematic and wanton destruction and damage to their religious sites and cultural monuments". The prosecution in the trial sought to prove Milošević guilty of those actions and events. In his defense, Milošević asserted that Kosovo Albanian heritage sites, in addition to Serb Orthodox historical and religious monuments were damaged by NATO bombing. Yugoslav Serb authorities in several cases alleged that NATO destroyed monuments, however the investigative team led by András Riedlmayer found them intact like two Ottoman bridges and the Sinan Pasha Mosque. Investigators absolved NATO of responsibility except for damage to a village mosque roof and a disused Catholic church damaged through an air blast after an nearby army base was struck by a missile. Riedlmayer's report to the Milošević trial concluded that kulla dwellings and a third of mosques were subjected to damage and destruction, with three Ottoman period urban centres being devastated due to intentionally lit fires. The report also noted that the Yugoslav Serb army, paramilitary and police forces and in some instances Serb civilians did those attacks, according to eyewitness accounts. Riedlmayer found out that Yugoslav Serb forces used as bases of operation two Catholic churches which in international law was prohibited. The investigative team noted that destruction and damage of Kosovo Albanian heritage sites were done during the 1999 war through ground attack and not air strikes.

Charges relating to crimes against humanity, the prosecution had to prove that armed conflict occurred, systematic and widespread attack existed, the conduct of Milošević was related to systematic and widespread attack upon a civilian population and that he was aware of the wider situation where his conduct happened. The prosecution also had to prove that Milošević had the necessary state of mind for crimes that were wilful, intentional or having a disregard of consequences for human life by actions committed by himself or his subordinates. Apart from the need to prove intent for committing the crime of persecution, the prosecution had to demonstrate that those actions were undertaken with intent toward discriminating on religious, political and racial grounds. Within the context of Milošević as an individual, charges against him related to individual and command responsibility. In the case against Milošević, he was accused of ordering, planning, instigating alongside aiding and abetting toward planning, preparing and executing crimes, with the act of committing being in reference to participating in a criminal enterprise and not being physically responsible for crimes. Milošević was also charged by the prosecutor for failure of his command responsibility and responsibility as a superior for acts done by subordinates where a superior was aware or knew that a subordinate was on the verge of violating international humanitarian law or committing war crimes; and that a superior failed to undertake measures to stop actions or punish perpetrators. Command responsibility was held by Milošević the prosecution alleged due to his position along with control and power, having no regard toward his position or both.

Milošević's death

Milošević was found dead in his cell on 11 March 2006, in the UN war crimes tribunal's detention center, located in the Scheveningen section of The Hague, Netherlands. The proceedings against him were terminated three days later, which effectively ended the trial.

Post-mortems soon established that Milošević had died of a heart attack. He had been suffering from heart problems and high blood pressure. Many suspicions were voiced to the effect that the heart attack had been caused or made possible deliberately – by the ICTY, according to sympathizers, or by himself, according to critics.

Milošević’s death occurred shortly after the Tribunal denied his request to seek specialized medical treatment at a cardiology clinic in Russia.

ICTY Chief Prosecutor Carla Del Ponte delivered her public statement following Milošević's death:

Due to Milošević's death during the trial, the court returned no verdict on the charges.

In 2016, the ICTY issued its judgement in the separate case against former Bosnian Serb leader Radovan Karadžić, which concluded that insufficient evidence had been presented in that case to find that Milosevic "agreed with the common plan" to create territories ethnically cleansed of non-Serbs during the Bosnian War of 1992 to 1995. The judgement noted "Milošević's repeated criticism and disapproval of the policies and decisions made by [Karadžić] and the Bosnian Serb leadership" and, in a footnote, the "apparent discord between [Karadžić] and Milošević" during which Milošević "openly criticised Bosnian Serb leaders of committing 'crimes against humanity' and 'ethnic cleansing' and the war for their own purposes." Nevertheless, the court also noted that Milošević also "shared and endorsed the political objective of the Accused [Karadžić]" and "provided assistance in the form of personnel, provisions, and arms to the Bosnian Serbs during the conflict".

See also
 Slobodan Milosevic – Glosses at a trial, a two-part documentary
 Milosevic on Trial, a 2007 Danish documentary
 Milosevic at the Hague, a play

Sources

References

Slobodan Milošević
Milosevic, Slobodan
Serbian–Albanian conflict